Mathilde ter Heijne (born 1969 in Strasbourg, France) is a Berlin-based Dutch artist primarily working within the mediums of video, performance, and installation practices. She studied in Maastricht at the Stadsacademie (1988–1992), in Amsterdam at the Rijksacademie voor Beeldende Kunsten (1992–1994). From 2011 to 2018 has been a professor of Visual Art, Performance, Media and Installation at Kunsthochschule Kassel and since 2018 she is professor of Visual Arts, Performance, and Media at the University of the Arts in Berlin.

Work 

Ter Heijne's research based practice is founded in intersectional feminism. Her video art produced in the 1990s destabilized patriarchal tropes within literature and cinema through elaborate re-stagings and role reversals. Some examples of this include Mathilde, Mathilde where the artist herself mimics suicidal female lovers in cinema adaptations or her 2001 video project Small Things End, Great things Endure where she offers a reading of Uwe Johnson's Jahrestage (1934–84). In both of these works, ter Heijne responds to female and culturally embedded generational trauma where in the end, be it a story, movie, or in real life, the woman always dies. This internal perpetual state of abjection or what Griselda Pollock has called the trauma of being born into a phallocentric world are both concepts that ter Heijne contends with and untimely rips apart. By "playing the victim," ter Heijne subtly reverses power roles transforming woman as object into woman as subject.

In her more recent work (2005–present), ter Heijne shows an activist and yet similarly radical approach to art-making as a participatory process. In her on-going project Woman To Go, she collects biographies from women that lived during the 19th century that are encroaching oblivion. To counteract cultural amnesia, she re-presents these biographies in the context of the art institution converting forgotten once relevant lives into speaking testimonies that reverberate traces through the present.

For ter Heijne, ritual and ceremony are structures for artistic observation and potential emancipation. Ritual, historically, is where woman has both lost and gained her power. For instance, marriage formatively and sometimes presently is a social contract entrapping women into what Simone de Beauvoir calls a Second Sex. Fuck Patriarchy! (2004) exemplifies this subservient, minor position of the Second Sex that woman historically occupied in bourgeoisie societies. Ter Heijne points to Dutch society within the 17th century as the originating point for this kind of patriarchal oppression. She places Vermeer's paintings of domicile female happiness at the apex of this banal perpetration of evil that glorifies woman as slaves. Within both the mythic and non-western culture, however, ritual has been a site for woman to seize power or be rescued from precarity. In Menschen Opfern, Mathilde ter Heijne's sculptural body double stands in for the body of Iphigenia who in Greek tragedy was saved from sacrifice to become a priestess. In the installation, cast bodies lay on an elevated stage as an operatic chorus from Christoph Willibald Gluck's opera Iphigénie en Tauride is heard in the background. The theatre stage and the chorus are both structures where participants act together in unison to weave together shared stories and experiences.

Statements 

Oliver Koerner von Gustorf in ArtMag: "her art really does aim at what really hurts—the mechanisms of oppressing women, domestic violence, marginalization, and self-sacrifice that lie hidden behind the facades of purportedly enlightened or intact family relationships."

Sophia Trollmann in the covering handout of the exhibition Performing Change: “She puts alternative ways of seeing and experiential values up for discussion in order to enable and implement a change in perspective, to create new realities.”

Catalogues 

Mathilde ter Heijne: Performing Change. Museum für Neue Kunst – Städtische Museen Freiburg, Germany: Sternberg Press, 2015.
Mathilde ter Heijne: Any Day Now. Kunsthalle Nürnberg im KunstKulturQuartier, Germany and Kunstmuseum Linz, Austria: Verlag für Moderne Kunst, Nürnberg 2010.
Mathilde ter Heijne: If it's me, it's not me. Ostfilder, Germany: Hatje Cantz Verlag, 2008.
Ingrid Calame, Mathilde ter Heijne, Jörg Wagner. Kunstverein Hannover, Germany, 2004.
Mathilde ter Heijne: Tragedy. Migros Museum für Gegenwartskunst, Zurich, Switzerland: Revolver Publishing, 2002.

Selected solo exhibitions 

2016 – Blood, Sweat and Tears, Galerie in Körnerpark, Berlin
2015 – It Will Be!, Kunstverein, Haus am Lützowplatz, Berlin
2014 – Performing Change, Museum für Neue Kunst Freiburg
2011 – Any Day Now, Lentos Museum, Linz
2010 – Any Day Now, Kunsthalle Nürnberg
2009 – Long Live Matriarchy!, Stedelijk Museum Bureau, Amsterdam
2006 – Woman To Go, Berlinische Galerie, Berlin
2005 – BASE 103, Götz Collection, Munich
2002 – Tragedy, Migros Museum für Gegenwartskunst, Zurich

References

External links 
 
 
Review in Frieze Magazine
Video Works at The Goetz Collection
Article in ArtMag 

1969 births
Living people
Artists from Strasbourg
20th-century Dutch artists
20th-century Dutch women artists
21st-century Dutch artists
21st-century Dutch women artists